This is a list of Portuguese football transfers for the summer of 2016. The summer transfer window will open 1 July and close at midnight on 1 September. Players may be bought before the transfer windows opens, but may only join their new club on 1 July. Only moves involving Primeira Liga clubs are listed. Additionally, players without a club may join a club at any time.

Transfers

 A player who signed with a club before the opening of the summer transfer window, will officially join his new club on 1 July. While a player who joined a club after 1 July will join his new club following his signature of the contract.

References

Lists of Portuguese football transfers
Football transfers summer 2016
2016–17 in Portuguese football